Jonathan Tammuz is a British-Canadian film director, best known for directing the short film The Childeater and the feature film Rupert's Land. The Childeater was a shortlisted Academy Award nominee for Best Live Action Short Film at the 62nd Academy Awards, and Rupert's Land was a Genie Award nominee for Best Picture at the 19th Genie Awards, with Tammuz also nominated for Best Director.

The son of Israeli writer Benjamin Tammuz, he grew up in England where his father was a cultural attaché at the Israeli embassy and a writer in residence at Oxford University. He met and married Lib Stephen, a Canadian, when they were both studying at England's National Film and Television School; Stephen was the screenwriter for both The Childeater and Tammuz's film Cordoba. Tammuz subsequently directed a 1997 film adaptation of his father's novel Minotaur before making Rupert's Land.

Tammuz and Stephen currently reside in Vancouver, British Columbia, where they are partners in a production firm; Tammuz is also a film instructor at Langara College and Stephen also works as an illustrator.

References

External links

British film directors
British film producers
British Jews
British emigrants to Canada
Film producers from British Columbia
Film directors from Vancouver
Living people
Year of birth missing (living people)
Langara College people
Jewish Canadian filmmakers